Mark Rietman (born 28 November 1960) is a Dutch actor. He appeared in more than forty films since 1985.

Selected filmography

References

External links 

1960 births
Living people
Dutch male film actors
20th-century Dutch people
21st-century Dutch people